Euriphene bernaudi, or Bernaud's nymph, is a butterfly in the family Nymphalidae. It is found in Nigeria and Cameroon. The habitat consists of sub-montane forests.

References

External links
Type images at Royal Museum for Central Africa

Butterflies described in 1994
Euriphene